

230001–230100 

|-bgcolor=#f2f2f2
| colspan=4 align=center | 
|}

230101–230200 

|-id=151
| 230151 Vachier ||  || Frederic Vachier (born 1974), a celestial mechanician and observer at the IMCCE-Observatory in Paris. He has studied binary asteroids, both as an observer and as a theorist for orbit determinations. || 
|-id=155
| 230155 Francksallet ||  || Franck Sallet (born 1970), a French amateur astronomer || 
|}

230201–230300 

|-bgcolor=#f2f2f2
| colspan=4 align=center | 
|}

230301–230400 

|-bgcolor=#f2f2f2
| colspan=4 align=center | 
|}

230401–230500 

|-id=415
| 230415 Matthiasjung ||  || Matthias Jung (born 1961), a German amateur astronomer || 
|}

230501–230600 

|-bgcolor=#f2f2f2
| colspan=4 align=center | 
|}

230601–230700 

|-id=631
| 230631 Justino || 2003 MB || Justino Sota Martinez (1931–2017) was the father of the discoverer. He was a Catholic priest in Atauta between 1954 and 1964. Then he got a bachelor's degree in literature, and become a secondary school teacher in Villaca\~{n}as and Tres Cantos. With his wife Carmen Ballano, he had two children (Fernando and Alfredo). || 
|-id=648
| 230648 Zikmund ||  || Sigismund of Luxembourg or Zikmund Lucemburský (1368–1437), Holy Roman Emperor, King of Hungary, Croatia, Germany, Italy, and Bohemia || 
|-id=656
| 230656 Kovácspál ||  || Pál Kovács (1912–1995), a Hungarian Olympic fencer and sports leader || 
|-id=691
| 230691 Van Vogt ||  || Alfred Elton van Vogt (1912–2000), a Canadian-born science-fiction writer || 
|}

230701–230800 

|-id=736
| 230736 Jalyhome ||  || Jalyhome, a school/orphanage for lepers in Pondicherry, India || 
|-id=765
| 230765 Alfbester ||  || Alfred Bester (1913–1987), an American science-fiction writer || 
|}

230801–230900 

|-bgcolor=#f2f2f2
| colspan=4 align=center | 
|}

230901–231000 

|-id=975
| 230975 Rogerfederer ||  || Roger Federer (born 1981), a Swiss tennis player || 
|}

References 

230001-231000